Artur Maratovich Sokhiyev (born 27 September 2002) is a Russian football player.

Club career
He made his debut in the Russian Premier League for FC Rostov on 18 October 2020 in a game against FC Akhmat Grozny.

On 24 February 2021, he was loaned to FC Yessentuki.

On 10 September 2021, Sokhiyev signed for Armenian Premier League club Noravank. Sokhiyev left Noravank by mutual agreement on 18 January 2022.

Career statistics

Club

References

External links
 
 

2002 births
Living people
Russian footballers
Association football forwards
FC Spartak Vladikavkaz players
FC Rostov players
FC Dynamo Stavropol players
FC Dynamo Makhachkala players
Russian Premier League players
Russian First League players
Russian Second League players
Armenian Premier League players
Russian expatriate footballers
Expatriate footballers in Armenia
Russian expatriate sportspeople in Armenia